The Escape is a 1928 American drama film directed by Richard Rosson and written by Garrett Graham and Paul Schofield. It is based on the 1913 play The Escape by Paul Armstrong. The film stars William Russell, Virginia Valli, Nancy Drexel, George Meeker, William Demarest and James Gordon. The film was released on April 29, 1928, by Fox Film Corporation.

Cast      
William Russell as Jerry Magee
Virginia Valli as May Joyce
Nancy Drexel as Jennie Joyce
George Meeker as Dr. Don Elliott
William Demarest as Trigger Caswell
James Gordon as Jim Joyce

References

External links
 

1928 films
1920s English-language films
Silent American drama films
1928 drama films
Fox Film films
Films directed by Richard Rosson
American silent feature films
American black-and-white films
1920s American films